The grapheme Ť (minuscule: ť) is a letter in the Czech and Slovak alphabets used to denote /c/, the voiceless palatal plosive (precisely alveolo-palatal), the sound similar to British English t in stew. It is formed from Latin T with the addition of háček; minuscule (ť) has háček modified to apostrophe-like stroke instead of wedge. In the alphabet, Ť is placed right after regular T.

Encoding

See also
Czech orthography
Czech phonology

References

Latin letters with diacritics